Spahats Creek Falls, also called Spahats Falls, is a waterfall on Spahats Creek within Wells Gray Provincial Park of British Columbia, Canada.

Spahats Creek rises from snowmelt and springs at a pass between Raft Mountain and Trophy Mountain. It flows 15 km west before tumbling over Spahats Falls and entering the Clearwater River.

Spahats is the First Nations term for bear and the stream was long known as Bear Creek. When the first accurate topographical map of the Clearwater Valley was published in 1953, it labelled the stream as “Bear Creek” and the falls as “Spahats (Bear) Creek Falls”. By the late 1960s, “Spahats” had become an accepted alternative due to the large number of Bear creeks in British Columbia and was officially adopted.

These impressive natural features used to be protected as tiny Spahats Creek Provincial Park, but in 1997 the boundaries of Wells Gray Provincial Park were expanded south along the Clearwater River and included Spahats. Tourists today see the anomaly of a "Wells Gray Park" entrance sign beside the road just south of Spahats Creek and another, more elaborate, sign  further north. Spahats Creek Park used to have its own 20-unit campground with an attractive location deep in an old-growth forest, but in 2006 it was closed and converted into a gigantic parking lot.

Formation
Like the larger Helmcken Falls, Spahats Falls owes its formation to deposits of volcanic rock in the Wells Gray-Clearwater volcanic field. After the eruptions, the Clearwater River re-established its course and began cutting into the lava. During the Pleistocene, gigantic icefields scraped away at the lava. When all this ice melted, the floods completed the carving of Granite Canyon on the Clearwater River and the side canyon where Spahats Falls occurs.

Trails

 The main trail from the parking lot to the falls viewing platform takes about 5 mins to walk.
 An alternate and slightly longer trail goes from the parking lot along the edge of Spahats Creek Canyon and joins the main trail.
 A scenic trail starts at the viewing platform and goes north along the rim of Granite Canyon. It is a 20-minute walk to the Clearwater Valley Overlook. Return the same way or follow the access road back to the parking lot.
 A short trail from the south-east corner of the parking lot follows Spahats creek upstream to a small loop trail originally built as a nature trail for the former campground. A 5 minute walk leads to a stand of impressive old growth red cedar trees.
 The bottom of Spahats Falls is a strenuous scramble that starts at the viewing platform and quickly descends 300 m. Don't go during May and June when the canyon is very wet and the creek may be in flood.
 The Clearwater River Trail is 17 km one-way and can be accessed at several points for a shorter hike.
 A trail to the Spahats Natural Bridge starts 1.5 km south of the viewpoint turnoff and takes less than 30 minutes each way. The trailhead is not signed and the trail is rough and steep.
 For detailed descriptions of these trails, refer to the guidebook Exploring Wells Gray Park.

See also

Wells Gray-Clearwater volcanic field
List of waterfalls
Volcanism in Canada
Wells Gray Provincial Park

References

Waterfalls of British Columbia
Volcanism of British Columbia
Wells Gray-Clearwater
Kamloops Division Yale Land District